The 1916–17 Northern Rugby Football Union season was the second  season of Rugby league's Wartime Emergency League football. Each club played a differing number of fixtures, depending upon the closeness of neighbours, ease of travel etc., with Brighouse Rangers and Barrow playing 17 games each while Broughton Rangers played 35 and several other clubs 32.

Season summary
The war was starting its third year and the Rugby League decided to continue with the Wartime Emergency League. This arrangement, as in other sports, meant that the sport could continue, which in turn would boost the public’s moral. The fixtures were usually quite local, thus cutting down on travelling time and costs, whilst not wasting precious war resources.

Several clubs did not participate during this season :-

The Featherstone Rovers who joined for the previous season 1915–16 left the league and the name did not appear in the (semi) professional ranks until they joined the Northern Rugby Football League for the 1921–22 season.
Keighley again did not take part and in fact did not re-enter the league until the first peacetime League in 1919–20.

Several of the clubs who had not participated in the competition in the previous season, now re-joined the League :-

Wakefield Trinity
Warrington
Widnes
No new clubs joined the league for this season.

Dewsbury (81.25%) again finished the regular season top of the league, with Leeds (80.65%) again second.

Dewsbury had played one game more, winning this and gaining two points more than Leeds, thus ending the season with a better win percentage.

Dewsbury again took the title.

There were no other trophies to play for during this season.

Championship

Challenge Cup
The Challenge Cup Competition was suspended for the duration of the war.
The majority of the trophies, such as the County Leagues and County Cups were also suspended for the duration of the First World War.

Notes and Comments 
1 - re-joined the League

See also 
British rugby league system
1915–16 Northern Rugby Football Union Wartime Emergency League season
1917–18 Northern Rugby Football Union Wartime Emergency League season
1918–1919 (January) Northern Rugby Football Union Wartime Emergency League season
1919 (Feb-May) Northern Rugby Football Union Victory season
The Great Schism – Rugby League View
The Great Schism – Rugby Union View
List of defunct rugby league clubs

References

External links
1896–97 Northern Rugby Football Union season at wigan.rlfans.com
Hull&Proud Fixtures & Results 1896/1897
 Widnes Vikings - One team, one passion Season In Review - 1896-97 
Saints Heritage Society
Warrington History
Wigan Archives - Cherry and white

Defunct rugby league teams
1916 in English rugby league
1917 in English rugby league
Northern Rugby Football Union seasons